Matthias Ostrzolek (born 5 June 1990) is a German professional footballer who plays as a left-back.

Early life 
Ostrzolek's parents emigrated from the Polish region of Silesia and settled in Bochum. Ostrzolek was born on 5 June 1990 in Bochum and grew up in the district of Langendreer.

International career
In 2007, Ostrzolek played in two matches for the U-17 national team of Poland against Lithuania. He did not receive further call-ups from Poland national teams and later chose to represent Germany at the youth level.

On 21 March 2011, Ostrzolek was first invited to the U-21 national team of Germany, when he was nominated by coach Rainer Adrion for the friendlies against the Netherlands and Italy. On 25 March 2011, he was brought on as a substitute in the 22nd minute for Shervin Radjabali-Fardi in a 3–1 win in Sittard-Geleen against the Netherlands. Four days later he came in to replace the 2–2 draw against Italy in Kassel in the 83rd minute for İlkay Gündoğan. Matthias Ostrzolek qualified with the U-21 National Team Germany for the European Under-21 Football Championships 2013. The team won in qualifying to win the group and eliminated in the play-off against Switzerland; a 1–1 draw in the first leg in the BayArena in Leverkusen followed by a 3–1 victory in the second leg in Lucerne. Ostrzolek did not play in the play-off. On 24 March 2013, Ostrzolek played for the last time for the U-21 team of Germany when he at 2–1 victory in the friendly match against Israel in Tel Aviv in the 19th minute came in to replace Tony Jantschke. On 16 May 2013, he was not nominated in the preliminary squad for U-21 Football Championship in 2013.

In December 2013, representatives from the Polish Football Association (PZPN) contacted Ostrzolek about playing for the senior national team of Poland. According to Ostrzolek, it was his first contact with Polish football officials since his brief stint with the U-17 team. Ostrzolek stated that he would be proud to represent either Poland or Germany and would need more time to decide. By his own admission, he can understand nearly everything in Polish but cannot express himself flawlessly in the language.

Ahead of the Euro 2016 qualifying match between Poland and Germany in October 2014, Ostrzolek stated he had not decided on his national team future. The player stated, “I still haven’t decided between Germany and Poland. I don’t know for which national team I will play.”

Career statistics

1.Includes German Cup.
2.Includes Promotion/relegation playoffs.

References

1990 births
Living people
Sportspeople from Bochum
Citizens of Poland through descent
Polish footballers
Poland youth international footballers
German footballers
Germany under-21 international footballers
German people of Polish descent
Association football defenders
VfL Bochum players
VfL Bochum II players
FC Augsburg players
Hamburger SV players
Hannover 96 players
FC Admira Wacker Mödling players
Bundesliga players
2. Bundesliga players
Austrian Football Bundesliga players
Footballers from North Rhine-Westphalia
German expatriate footballers
Expatriate footballers in Austria
German expatriate sportspeople in Austria